Campbell College located in Belfast, Northern Ireland and founded in 1894 comprises a preparatory school department (junior age) and a senior Northern Ireland 'Voluntary Grammar' school, the latter meaning, in terms of provision of education, a government funded, selective school.

The school is one of a number of schools in the state funded grammar sector in Northern Ireland which can offer paid boarding places to some pupils, typically to be funded by the pupil, although the majority of pupils are day pupils.

It is one of the eight schools of Northern Ireland represented on the Headmasters' and Headmistresses' Conference and is a member of the Independent Schools Council.

Legal Status

Campbell College is one of very few voluntary grammar schools in Northern Ireland entitled to be classified as a 'Voluntary B' grammar school, where most voluntary grammars within this state sector are 'Voluntary A'. Voluntary grammar schools, though state schools by educational funding, are each managed by independent educational charities on the privately owned grounds and infrastructure of those charities. The College's 'Voluntary B' designation enables this grammar school, which is state funded for education provision, to charge a degree of fees to pupils, separate completely to the education process, officially termed the "capital fee". 

The capital fees charged to the grammar school pupils are purely for the upkeep of historic buildings and grounds and not for any part of the education. (Voluntary 'B' grammars receive much less state capital funding for physical upkeep than other voluntary grammars.) At Campbell College the schooling itself in the grammar school does not come under fee-paying terms. In common with all other Northern Ireland grammar schools of all types, the schooling itself is taxpayer funded per pupil through the government authority for those successful in admission within the school's own selection process.

Location
The school occupies a  estate in east Belfast, close to the Parliament Buildings at Stormont. All the school's facilities are located on this site, which also contains a small lake and forest named Netherleigh. 

Campbell's junior school – formerly located on an adjacent site and called Cabin Hill – is now also located on the site. The school has the oldest Combined Cadet Force in Northern Ireland, with over 400 cadets. The school has an international reputation and attracts boarders from all over the world.

History
It was founded in 1894 with a bequest by Henry James Campbell, who made his fortune in the linen trade, and left money to found a school based on the values of a Liberal Protestant education. Initially the school was primarily a boarding school but it has, particularly since the 1970s, become primarily a day school; in 2009 it had 879 pupils, only about 85 (10%) of whom were boarders. As a selective independent school, it admits pupils based on academic selection. Until 2006 pupils began at the school at age 11, but since the closure of the school's separate preparatory school, Cabin Hill, the school has accepted pupils from age 4 into the newly built Junior School, and both boys and girls into the school's kindergarten located on the school's grounds. The Latin motto of the school is Ne Obliviscaris ("Do Not Forget").

Campbell College Central Hall was one of many hosting locations across Belfast and Ulster where the Ulster Covenant was signed by many in opposition to home rule on 28 September 1912.

In 1935 Jimmy Steele led an attempted Irish Republican Army raid on the school to secure the arms inside the college Officers' Training Corps. The RUC at Strandtown was tipped off and the raid was unsuccessful. A gun battle took place at the gate lodge on Hawthornden Road in which Constable Ian Hay received five gunshot wounds, but survived. In 1936 Steele and three other IRA members were captured, prosecuted and imprisoned in Crumlin Road Gaol.

Campbell lost 126 former students in World War I. During World War II the school was requisitioned by the War Office as a hospital, with the pupils transferred to Portrush, north Antrim. There are separate memorials to the dead of both World Wars in the Central Hall.

The author C.S. Lewis, who grew up nearby, attended the school for two months, but was withdrawn because of a serious respiratory illness and sent to Malvern (Cherbourg School), famous at the time for treating people with lung problems. The gas lamppost on the school drive is claimed to have been the inspiration for that mentioned in Lewis' The Lion, the Witch and the Wardrobe, though some sources state a lamppost in Crawfordsburn Country Park was the inspiration. Still others believe that the gas lamps in the lower area of the woods on the Malvern Hills above the town were his inspiration. Lewis claimed in his autobiography Surprised by Joy that Campbell retained the character of an English public school before to the reforms of Arnold.

Several Campbell students have been involved in filmmaking. These include William MacQuitty (A Night to Remember), Andrew Eaton (Resurrection Man), Nick Hamm (The Hole), Dudi Appleton (The Most Fertile Man in Ireland), and Mark Huffam (Saving Private Ryan).  A collection of Lepidoptera by Thomas Workman is displayed in the school.

On 27 October 2016, the President of Ireland, Michael D. Higgins visited Linen Hall Library for the first time. A choir combining students from Holy Cross Boys' Primary School and Campbell College performed at the special event.

School houses
Currently there are six houses for day boys and one boarding house and these form the focus for participation across the curriculum. School houses are named after former masters and those of importance in the life of the school and play an integral part in everyday life in the school. The names of the current houses and their respective colours are:

 Alden's (dark green)
 Allison's (light green, formerly brown)
 Davis's (yellow)
 Dobbin's (light blue)
 Price's (dark blue)
 School House (boarding house) (black)
 Yates's (Red)

In the past there have been other Houses:
 Armour's (grey)
 Bowen's (maroon)
 Chase's (orange)
 Lytle's (dark green)
 Netherleigh (junior house) (light blue)
 Norwood (junior house) (dark green)
 Ormiston (junior house) (dark blue)
 Tweskard (junior house) (red)

Each house is run by a "house master" who is in charge of managing the house and overseeing the "house tutors", all of whom have allocated year groups which they are responsible for. Each house has a designated student who is "head of house", and they usually have a deputy. However, this is not always the case. The head of house, along with his deputy are sixth form students who have earned responsibility within the school, and it is common place for them to also be prefects, or so called "peer mentors". These two students organise house sporting, charity and dramatic events, among various other things.

Uniform
School colours are black and white and/or green if one is awarded major honours which enables one to also acquire a green blazer accompanied by an optional green pullover. The school uniform consists of a black badged blazer, House tie (with colour representing house), black trousers, black shoes with an optional V-neck pullover.

Sport
The school has a strong record in rugby, having won the Ulster Schools Cup 24 times and shared the cup four times. In 2018 Campbell beat Royal School Armagh at Ravenhill.

The school has extensive sports facilities including rugby and football pitches, two water based hockey pitches, 25-metre indoor shooting range, four tennis courts, squash courts, a fitness suite, and a swimming pool. The 2006 opening of the new synthetic hockey pitches was marked with an exhibition match between the gold-winning 1988 Summer Olympics Great Britain and Northern Ireland hockey team and the school's 1st XI, which ended 3–2 to the Olympic champions of old. The Campbellians Hockey Club play at this venue.

Colours
A student can be awarded his "colours" as a tangible recognition of success achieved, dedication demonstrated and good example shown through the medium of any Campbell sport which participates in external/extramural competition, or through the College's music and drama programme.

The Colours system is divided into two categories, that is, Major Colours and Club Colours:

 The award of Major Colours permits the successful recipient to wear a green blazer with appropriate badge, a major colours tie and a green V-neck pullover.
 Club Colours are denoted by a different pocket on the black school blazer, the pocket design reflecting the student’s preferred discipline.

As a rule of thumb, Major Colours for sporting activities are gained by those who have successfully represented their senior team or age group team, in their respective sport throughout the season of the award, while demonstrating a high level of performance and an approach which is both dedicated and a fine example to their peers.

The award of Club Colours has two main functions. Firstly, the Colour acts as a reward given to senior boys who have not necessarily represented one of our first teams, been placed highly in individual sports competition or excelled in the areas of music or drama, but whose dedication and loyalty to the schools’s curriculum is unquestionable. Secondly, this Colour may be awarded to younger students as recognition of their success at what might be considered to be the developmental stage of their school career.

Students are nominated for Major and Club Colours by the member of staff in charge of the given activity to the Colours Committee. The Colours Committee comprises teaching staff whose interests within our total curriculum are wide and whose experience is considerable. Following due consideration and deliberation, decisions made by the Colours Committee are taken by its chairman to the Headmaster for his agreement.

Notable Old Campbellians

Past pupils are known as Old Campbellians or OCs and the school has an extensive past pupil organisation known as The Old Campbellian Society which has several branches across the United Kingdom, USA and Asia as well as regular OC reunions at the school itself. The school colours are black and white, whilst the OC colours are black, white and green.

Dudi Appleton, director, screenwriter and journalist
Derek Bell, harpist, member of The Chieftains
Edward Armstrong Bennet, army chaplain, psychiatrist, analytical psychologist, friend of Carl Jung, author 
Paul Bew, scholar and life peer
Andrew Bree, swimmer
Thomas Watters Brown, judge
Gordon Burns, journalist and television presenter
Sir Anthony Campbell, retired judge
William C. Campbell, parasitologist and Nobel Laureate in Physiology/Medicine
David Caves, actor who is perhaps best known for his role as Jack Hodgson in the BBC drama series Silent Witness
Sir John Collins, businessman
David S. Crawford, librarian
Freeman Wills Crofts, author; was a member of the school's first class in 1894
George Currie, Northern Irish barrister and politician
Edmund De Wind, Victoria Cross recipient
Eric Robertson Dodds, classical scholar
William John English, Victoria Cross recipient whose medal was bequeathed to the school
Chris Farrell, rugby union footballer for Ireland
Thomas Henry Flewett, virologist
Mike Gibson
Lloyd Hall-Thompson, British Member of Parliament
Gordon Hamilton (rugby player)
Paddy Hirsch, journalist, author, award-winning reporter, producer and presenter for NPR and Marketplace (radio program)
Michael Hoey, golfer
John Irvine, award-winning ITV News journalist
Ken Kennedy (rugby player)
Charles Lawson, actor
C. S. Lewis, author
Gary Lightbody, vocalist and guitarist in Snow Patrol
Sir John MacDermott, Baron MacDermott, former Lord Chief Justice of Northern Ireland
James Godfrey MacManaway, MP and Church of Ireland minister
William MacQuitty, film producer
Neil McComb, rugby union footballer for Ulster
Colonel Sir Michael McCorkell – Northern Irish soldier
Sir Percy McElwaine, barrister and Attorney General of Fiji
Alan McFarland, former British Army officer and Ulster Unionist politician
Alan McKibbin, British Member of Parliament
F. E. McWilliam, sculptor
A.P.W. Malcomson, historian
Tim Martin, founder and chairman of JD Wetherspoon
Darren Meredith, footballer
John Morrow, peace activist
Tom O'Toole, rugby union footballer for Ulster
Julie Parkes now Brown, Northern Ireland's first Female Olympic Swimmer Los Angeles 1984 
Stuart Pollock, cricketer and cricket administrator
Jonny Quinn, drummer in Snow Patrol
John Thompson Shepherd, physician and medical researcher
James Simmons, poet
Jamie Smith, rugby union footballer for Ulster
Patrick Taylor, novelist, creator of the Irish Country series
Noel Thompson, BBC journalist
Air Chief Marshal John Thomson, RAF officer
Paddy Wallace, rugby union footballer for Ireland
Robyn Ward, Irish contemporary artist.
Charles Richard Whitfield, Leading Obstetrician and Gynaecologist, pioneer of maternal-fetal medicine and a Regius Professor of Midwifery

Headmasters
Henry Richard Parker, joint headmaster 1890–1896
James Adams McNeill, joint headmaster 1890–96, headmaster 1896–1907
Robert Arthur H MacFarland, 1907–1922
William Duff Gibbon, 1922–1943, educated at Trinity College, Oxford, served as a lieutenant-colonel in the Worcestershire Regiment during World War I; in World War II the Officer Commanding in the Army Cadet Force. 
Ronald Groves, 1943–1954
Francis John Granville Cook, 1954–1971
Robin Milne Morgan, 1971–1976
Brian William John Gregg Wilson, 1977–1987
Robert John Ivan Pollock, 1987–2005
Brian Funstan 2005–2006 (acting headmaster)
James "Jay" Piggot, 2006–2012
Robert M. Robinson, 2012–present

References

External links
Official Website
Profile on the Independent Schools Council website
Campbell College CCF Website
The Old Campbellian Society

Grade B1 listed buildings
Educational institutions established in 1894
Private schools in Northern Ireland
Grammar schools in Belfast
Member schools of the Headmasters' and Headmistresses' Conference
Boarding schools in Ireland
Boarding schools in Northern Ireland
1894 establishments in Ireland